Graphium ramaceus, the Pendlebury's zebra, is a species of butterfly in the family Papilionidae (swallowtails). It is found in parts of the Indomalayan realm.

Subspecies
G. r. ramaceus (Borneo)
G. r. pendleburyi (Corbet, 1941) (Peninsular Malaya, Langkawi Island)
G. r. interjectus (Honrath, 1893) (Sumatra)

Status
Graphium ramaceus is uncommon, but not rare and not thought to be threatened.

References

External links
Butterfly corner Images from Naturhistorisches Museum Wien

ramaceus
Butterflies of Borneo
Butterflies of Indochina
Butterflies described in 1872